Mui Tsz Lam is an upland Hakka village in the North District, in the northeastern part of the New Territories of Hong Kong.

Administration
Mui Tsz Lam is a recognized village under the New Territories Small House Policy.

History
Mui Tsz Lam is over 300 years old. It is one of the seven Hakka villages of the Hing Chun Yeuk, which comprises Kop Tong, Lai Chi Wo, Mui Tsz Lam, Ngau Shi Wu, Sam A Village, Siu Tan, and So Lo Pun.

Mui Tsz Lam was abandoned in the 1970s. The village has been the focus of conservation and revitalization projects in the late 2010s and early 2020s, with the village being reconnected to the electricity grid in 2021.

Flora and fauna
The villages of Mui Tsz Lam and Kop Tong are surrounded by dense woodland. The stream system at Lai Chi Wo, Mui Tsz Lam and Kop Tong provides habitats for three amphibian species of conservation concern: Chinese Bullfrog Hoplobatrachus chinensis, Big-headed Frog Limnonectes fujianensis and Lesser Spiny Frog Paa exilispinosa. The fung shui woodlands at Mui Tsz Lam and
Kop Tong support a diversity of plans, including Pavetta hongkongensis and Aquilaria sinensis of conservation significance.

Access
Mui Tsz Lam can be reached by foot from Lai Chi Wo. The walk takes about 15 minutes.

References

External links
 Delineation of area of existing village Mui Tsz Lam (Sha Tau Kok) for election of resident representative (2019 to 2022)

Villages in North District, Hong Kong